Glenys Anne Nall ( Beasley; born 12 February 1944) is a retired Australian sprinter. During the 1962 British Empire and Commonwealth Games in Perth, she won a gold medal in the 4 × 110 yards relay, and also competed in the 100 yards event. She was also the Australian national champion in the women's 100 yards in 1962.

Born in Victoria, Beasley attended Camberwell High School from 1958 to 1961.

References

1944 births
Living people
20th-century Australian women
21st-century Australian women
21st-century Australian people
Athletes (track and field) at the 1962 British Empire and Commonwealth Games
Australian female sprinters
Commonwealth Games gold medallists for Australia
Sportswomen from Victoria (Australia)
Commonwealth Games medallists in athletics
Medallists at the 1962 British Empire and Commonwealth Games